Darcy Zajac (born September 23, 1986) is a Canadian professional ice hockey player who last played for the Lorenskog Is of the Get-Ligen (Norway).  He previously played for the Albany Devils of the American Hockey League.

Career
Prior to turning professional, Zajac attended the University of North Dakota where he played NCAA Division 1 hockey for the North Dakota Fighting Sioux.

Zajac joined the Albany Devils in 2010.  He signed a two-year, two-way contract with the New Jersey Devils in 2013. After his contract with the Devils' organization expired in 2015, he joined the Danish club SønderjyskE.

For the 2016-17 season, Zajac joined the UK's Coventry Blaze. However Zajac left to go play in Lorenskog Norway in October 2016.

Personal life
Darcy is the second of four Zajac brothers.  His older brother, Travis, is a forward with the New York Islanders and his younger brother Kelly plays in the ECHL. The youngest brother, Nolan, played with the NCAA Denver Pioneers.  Their father, Tom, also played for the University of Denver.

Career statistics

References

External links

1986 births
Living people
Adirondack Phantoms players
Albany Devils players
Canadian ice hockey forwards
North Dakota Fighting Hawks men's ice hockey players
Ice hockey people from Winnipeg
Trenton Devils players
SønderjyskE Ishockey players
Coventry Blaze players
Canadian expatriate ice hockey players in England
Canadian expatriate ice hockey players in Denmark